FC Alagir was a Russian football team from Alagir. It played professionally in 1994 and 1995, their best result was 12th place in Zone 1 of the Russian Third League in 1994.

Team name history
 1992-1995 FC Spartak Alagir
 1999 FC "Spartak" Alagir

External links
  Team history at KLISF

Association football clubs established in 1992
Defunct football clubs in Russia
Sport in North Ossetia–Alania
1992 establishments in Russia